Marat Nazhmudinovich Ksanayev (born 5 March 1981) is a former Russian professional footballer.

Club career
He played 9 seasons in the Russian Football National League for PFC Spartak Nalchik, FC Volgar-Gazprom Astrakhan and FC Chernomorets Novorossiysk.

References

External links
 

1981 births
Living people
Russian footballers
Association football midfielders
PFC Spartak Nalchik players
FC Volgar Astrakhan players
FC Chernomorets Novorossiysk players
FC Atyrau players
Kazakhstan Premier League players
Russian expatriate footballers
Expatriate footballers in Kazakhstan
Russian expatriate sportspeople in Kazakhstan